Thieves is an American drama television series created by Jim Leonard. The series stars John Stamos, Melissa George, Robert Knepper and Tone Lōc. The series aired on ABC from September 28 to November 23, 2001.

Plot summary 
After being caught, professional criminals Johnny (John Stamos) and Rita (Melissa George) make a deal with Special Agent Shue (Robert Knepper) to work for the government in exchange for jail time.

Cast
John Stamos as Johnny 
Melissa George as Rita 
Robert Knepper as Special Agent Shue 
Tone Lōc as Agent Al Trundell

Episodes

References

External links
 
 

2000s American drama television series
2001 American television series debuts
2001 American television series endings
English-language television shows
American Broadcasting Company original programming
Television series by Warner Bros. Television Studios